Tytherton Lucas is a hamlet in the civil parish of Bremhill in the ceremonial county of Wiltshire, England. The River Avon passes to the west, and the Cat Brook and Cade Burma streams flow just to the north.

History
Historically, Tytherton Lucas belonged to the Hundred of Chippenham. The hamlet is documented in the Domesday Book of 1086, which documents that Burghelm (Borel) held two hides of land and a William Hard owned four hides in Terintone or Tedlinton. In the 14th century, William Percehay, John Turpyn and Walter Scudamore held the Tytherton Knight's Fee, serving the Crown with feudal obligations. In around 1150, the tithes of Tytherton and Chippenham were granted to Monkton Farleigh Priory by Empress Matilda.

By 1650, the local chapel had fallen into a dilapidated state, and the parishioners wished  opted to form a new independent parish with East Tytherton, Bremhill and Langley Burre.

Landmarks
The Grade II* listed Anglican church of St Nicholas is a chapel of ease belonging to St Andrew's, Chippenham, dating from the 13th century and rebuilt in 1802. The church bell is from the 12th century, making it one of the oldest in the county.

Manor Farmhouse, from the 17th century, is also Grade II* listed. Other farms are from the 17th and 19th centuries.

References

External links

Hamlets in Wiltshire